Edgar Philip Perman (1866–1947) was an assistant professor of Chemistry at University College Cardiff and Monmouthshire.

Bibliography
The Direct Synthesis of Ammonia; Proc. R. Soc. Lond. A May 24, 1905 76:167-174
Determination of Vapour-Pressure by Air-Bubbling; Proc. R. Soc. Lond. A May 24, 1905 76:174-176 (with John Hughes Davies)
The elastic constants of glass; 1927 Proc. Phys. Soc. 40 186-192 (with William Donald Urry)
The properties of ammonium nitrate. Part V. The reciprocal salt-pair, ammonium nitrate and potassium chloride; J. Chem. Soc., Trans., 1923, 123, 841 - 849 (with Horace Leonard Saunders)

References

1866 births
1947 deaths